Alan Miller is an American video game designer who was the co-founder of the video game company Activision.

Career
Miller studied electrical engineering and computer science at the University of California, Berkeley, graduating in 1973.

Miller joined Atari, Inc. in February 1977 and was one of the first four Atari 2600 game designers. His 2600 titles include Surround, Hangman and Basketball. With others, he co-authored the operating system for the Atari 400/800 computers in late 1978 and early 1979. His last game for Atari, Basketball, was one of the first ROM games for the Atari computers. Miller did not work on any Atari 2600 cartridges during his last year with Atari.

In late 1979, Miller left Atari with three other programmers, David Crane, Larry Kaplan and Bob Whitehead. They were disillusioned and disappointed with Atari's refusal to give them screen credit for any of the games they worked on. With music industry executive, Jim Levy, they formed Activision, the first independent video game developer and publisher. Activision rapidly grew to US$159 million in revenue in 1983, its third year of sales. Miller acted as Vice President of Product Development and designed several of the company's first games. Among his games designed while with Activision are Checkers, Tennis, Ice Hockey, Starmaster and Robot Tank.  Miller experimented with implementing a 3D display for the game Checkers but due to technical limitations of both the Atari 2600 and television sets of the era, the idea was dropped.

Miller and Whitehead thought that diversification to other platforms, such as the home computers like the Commodore 64, was essential for success. Activision was resistant to this idea, so he and Whitehead left Activision in 1984 and together formed the game publisher Accolade. While with his new company, he designed only one game, Law of the West for the Commodore 64. Miller started as Vice President of Product Development but in a few years rose to Chairman and CEO.

After ten years at Accolade, Miller left in 1994. Accolade hit hard times and in 1999 was purchased by Infogrames, which later changed its subsidiaries' names to Atari, Atari Europe, Atari Australia, and Atari Japan respectively.

In September 2001, Miller rejoined David Crane at Crane's company, Skyworks Technologies, a leading developer of custom branded online games (advergames) for Fortune 100 companies, where he served as Vice President of Business Development for four years.

Click Health
In 1997, Miller co-founded Click Health, a pioneering publisher of health education games for children with asthma and diabetes. The games were made available for Nintendo consoles and IBM PCs. Miller served as Chairman and CEO. Clinical trials of the company's games demonstrated significant effectiveness. In a clinical trial with pediatric diabetes patients at Stanford University Medical Center and Kaiser Permanente, children who played the company's diabetes game, Packy and Marlon, experienced a 77% reduction in urgent care visits over six months, compared to children in the control group who were given a standard video game to play. The company's anti-smoking game, Rex Ronan: Experimental Surgeon, is an interactive exhibit in the Health Odyssey Museum at the Centers for Disease Control headquarters in Atlanta, Georgia, played by thousands of children each year as they tour the museum.

Unable to find significant interest in distribution of the effective games through health care providers, insurers, and government agencies, Click Health closed its doors in September 2001.

References

External links
 Photo of Alan Miller accepting an award for developing the first third-party video game development company at the 2003 GDC (second photo)
  Miller's library of work for the Atari 2600

American video game designers
Video game programmers
Year of birth missing (living people)
Living people
UC Berkeley College of Engineering alumni
Place of birth missing (living people)
Atari people
Game Developers Conference Pioneer Award recipients